The Reminiscences of Solar Pons is a collection of detective fiction short stories by author August Derleth.  It was released in 1961 by Mycroft & Moran in an edition of 2,052 copies.  It was the fifth collection of Derleth's Solar Pons stories which are pastiches of the Sherlock Holmes tales of Arthur Conan Doyle.

Contents

The Reminiscences of Solar Pons contains the following tales:

 "Introduction, by Anthony Boucher
 "The Adventure of the Mazarine Blue"
 "The Adventure of the Hats of M. Dulac"
 "The Adventure of the Mosaic Cylinders"
 "The Adventure of the Praed Street Irregulars"
 "The Adventure of the Cloverdale Kennels"
 "The Adventure of the Black Cardinal"
 "The Adventure of the Troubled Magistrate"
 "The Adventure of the Blind Clairaudient"
 "A Chronology of Solar Pons", by Robert Pattrick

Reprints
Los Angeles: Pinnacle, 1975.

References

1961 short story collections
Mystery short story collections
Sherlock Holmes pastiches
Solar Pons